Flat Top Mountain is a  peak in Utah and Tooele Counties, Utah in the United States, about  to the east of Rush Valley.

It is the highest point of the Oquirrh Mountains.

Flat Top Mountain overlooks Lehi, American Fork and the entire northern Utah county area. It can be seen everywhere in the greater Salt Lake Basin area.

See also
List of mountain peaks of Utah
List of Ultras of the United States

References

Mountains of Utah County, Utah
Mountains of Tooele County, Utah